The Chairman's Wife is a 1971 British short drama film directed by Gerry O'Hara and starring John Osborne, Zena Walker, Fiona Lewis and David de Keyser. The wife of a company's chairman stages her own kidnapping in order to gain money. The screenplay was part-written by Julian Holloway.

Cast
 John Osborne - Bernard Howe
 Zena Walker - Margaret Howe
 Fiona Lewis - Elaine Beckwith
 David de Keyser - Superintendent

References

External links

1971 films
1971 drama films
British drama short films
1971 short films
Films directed by Gerry O'Hara
1970s English-language films
1970s British films